Mirza Sulaiman Shikoh was a Mughal prince and the eldest son of Crown prince Dara Shikoh. He was executed in May 1662 at Gwalior Fort on the orders of his paternal uncle, Emperor Aurangzeb.

Early life 
Shazada Muhammad Sulaiman Shikoh Bahadur was born on 15 March 1635 to Prince Dara Shikoh and his first wife Shazadi Nadira Banu Begum. His mother was a Mughal princess and daughter of Shazada Muhammad Parviz (son of Jahangir) and Shazadi Iffat Jahan Begum. He was also the first grandchild of the then 43 year-old emperor, Shah Jahan. His paternal aunts included Jahanara Begum, Roshanara Begum and Gauharara Begum. His paternal uncles were Shah Shuja, Murad Bakhsh and Aurangzeb.

He was called "Potay Miya" by his grandfather Shah Jahan. Sulaiman Shikoh had two brothers and four sisters among his closed was Only Javeda un nissa.

In 1642, his father Dara Shikoh became the heir apparent to the Mughal throne.

Refuge in Srinagar, Kingdom of Garhwal 

After the defeat of Dara Shikoh at the battle of Samugarh on 29 May 1658, his son Suleiman Shikoh took refuge in Garhwal in 1659 A.D. Aurangzeb had spared the daughters and minor sons of his brothers, but as Dara Shikoh's heir, Sulaiman Shikoh was a threat.

According to Muntakhab-al Lubab, "Suleiman Shikoh had sought refuge with the zamindar of Srinagar". Travernier has also referred to Suleiman Shikoh's escape to Garhwal, but he has mixed the two incidents in one, i.e. of 'Nak-kati-Rani' and of Suleiman Shikoh's taking refuge in Garhwal. He has stated:

In the footnote, the translator V. Ball has mentioned that, "Sreenagar is the original Srinagar, the capital of Kashmir, and that the account is based upon hearsay". However, it is well known that Srinagar was the capital of the kingdom of Garhwal and it was founded by Raja Ajay Pal in 1358 A.D. In Tuzuk-i- Jahangiri, Srinagar has been referred to for the kingdom of Garhwal. Niccolao Manucci has also mentioned the name of Srinagar the capital, and the country of Srinagar, for the Garhwal kingdom. The translator's footnote that the incident is hearsay therefore cannot be accepted. According to Muntakhab- ul-Lubab, it is vividly evidenced that Suleiman Shikoh took refuge in Garhwal. The view is further supported by François Bernier, Manucci  and Qanungo.

Aurangzeb's attempts to extricate Sulaiman from Garhwal 
Aurangzeb tasked Sulaiman Shikoh's former ally Raja Jai Singh to capture the prince. Aurangzeb sent repeated messages through Raja Jai Singh to Prithvi Pat Shah, Raja of Garhwal, to surrender the prince but his persuasion and threats were met with contempt. In the book 'Bernier's Voyage to the East Indies’ it is mentioned that:

Manucci has also mentioned the defiant attitude of the Raja of Garhwal. The Raja wrote back to Raja Jai Singh that on no account he could harm his reputation by making over to Aurangzeb anyone who had sought his protection. He was however thankful for Raja Jai Singh's friendship, as for Aurangzeb he needed neither his promises nor his menaces. He further wrote that he might inform the Mughal that he had no respect for either his power or his victories and let him recall to mind the occasion when his father Shah Jahan sent an army to Garhwal and the survivors of that army had their noses chopped off. In the end he has commented, "let him know that he who could cut off noses could equally cut off heads."

Aurangzeb then took recourse to ruse. Dr. Qanungo is of the view that when Jai Singh could not convince the king of Garhwal to surrender Suleiman Shikoh, he instigated a powerful Brahmin minister against him who tried to give him poison in the form of medicine. But the vigilant prince tested the adulterated medicine on a cat and was saved. When the king discovered his minister's treachery he had him beheaded.

Later Jai Singh inspired the Garhwali prince Medni Shah to emulate Aurangzeb and revolt against his father.

Capture and aftermath 

According to the sources of local history, the tradition goes that when Prithvi Pat Shah sentenced his minister to death, the other ministers, officials and all the members of the family became hostile to him. Thereafter, his son Medni Shah, on the advice of his ministers, revolted against his father and tried to seize power. Concomitantly, on Aurangzeb's orders,  in late 1660 Jai Singh sent his son Ram Singh to Srinagar, Garhwal, to persuade the authorities to hand over Suleiman Shikoh to him, bearing the Emperor's dire threats. However, when Ram Singh met Prithvi Pat Shah, he refused to comply and told him that he will protect the Mughal prince as long as he lived.

Then Ram Singh and Medni Shah, who were friends, tried to hatch a conspiracy against Shikoh. But before they could take any action against him he discovered their motive and slipped away in the night with the intention of escaping to Tibet. Unfortunately he lost his way in the hills and was betrayed by the villagers. They informed Medni Shah of his whereabouts who had him arrested and handed him over to Ram Singh.

Shikoh was surrendered to Aurangzeb somewhere around December 1660 AD because according to Dr. Qanungo he was brought before Aurangzeb on 5 January 1661. Bernier has mentioned that,

Bernier has not detailed the circumstances in which Shikoh was surrendered and from his account it appears that Prithvi Pat Shah had to surrender to circumstances. But during the surrender it seems he was away from Srinagar, the capital of Garhwal. Bernier in his description has referred to the "hostile preparations of the neighbouring Rajahs," and Walton has mentioned that "during the reign of Pirthvi Shah the aggressions of the Kumaonis continued under the leadership of the then Raja Baz Bahadur who had already fought on the side of Khalel Ullah against the Garhwalis". It is possible that the neighbouring Raja of Kumaon must have launched an attack on the borders of Garhwal and during that period Prithvi Pat Shah had to move from Srinagar the capital to thwart the invasions of the Kumaonis.
 
The penitence of Raja Prithvi Pat Shah about his son's treachery indicates his innocence as regards the surrender of Shikoh. Manucci has stated:

Moreover, it seems that Medni Shah was banished from Garhwal owing to his misdeed of surrendering Shikoh. He had to leave Srinagar for Delhi on this issue where he died in 1662 A.D. His death in Delhi is corroborated by the ‘farman' which Aurangzeb sent to Prithvi Pat Shah in 1662 A.D. In the ‘farman' it is stated,

This farman is preserved in the U.P. State Archives in Lucknow.

On 5 January 1661, Shikoh was brought before Aurangzeb. Accounts say that Shikoh's entry into the court, in chains, made quite an impression. Many were moved to tears at the sight of the fallen prince. Apparently, even Aurangzeb softened and offered to spare Sulaiman. The prince stoically replied that if he was a lingering threat, he should be killed immediately; he also requested that he would not be left to rot in some prison. Perhaps miffed by the rebuff, Aurangzeb did not grant his wish.

Death 
On Aurangzeb's orders, Shikoh was imprisoned into a dungeon in Gwalior Fort. An opium-based poison was administered everyday so that the prince would descend into madness and infirmity. Many months passed, but Shikoh somehow did not deteriorate. In May 1662, after nearly eighteen months of imprisonment, Aurangzeb resolved to end the threat forever and ordered his men to strangle the prince. Suleiman Shikoh was thus executed. He was buried in the Traitor's Cemetery in Gwalior, where his uncle Murad was also buried.

Personal life 

Sulaiman Shikoh was married several times. Among these was a marriage with Anup Kanwar, daughter of Amar Singh of Nagaur.

Issue 
 Salima Banu Begum- married to Prince Muhammad Akbar. They were parents to the Mughal emperor Neku Siyar.
Daughter- married to Khwaja Bahauddin, son of Khwaja Parsa

Positions 

 Governor of Thatta 1649-1651
 Governor of Awadh 1655-1657
 Commander-in-Chief of Dara Shikoh's army 1641-1650

Ancestry

References 

1635 births
1662 deaths
Mughal princes
Timurid dynasty
Indian Muslims